Alex Buttazzoni (born 11 March 1985) is an Italian professional racing cyclist. He rode at the 2015 UCI Track Cycling World Championships.

References

External links
 

1985 births
Living people
Italian male cyclists
People from San Daniele del Friuli
Italian track cyclists
Cyclists from Friuli Venezia Giulia